Table Rock may refer to:

Canada
 Table Rock, Niagara Falls, a former rock formation
 Table Rock Welcome Centre, a retail center near the site of Table Rock, Niagara Falls

United States
 Table Rock (Ada County, Idaho), a hill near Boise, Idaho
 Table Rock, Missouri, a village in Taney County
 Table Rock State Park (Missouri)
 Table Rock, Phelps County, Missouri, an unincorporated community
 Table Rock, Nebraska
 Table Rock (North Carolina), a mountain
 Table Rock, West Virginia
 Table Rock, Wyoming
 Table Rock Indian Reservation, a former Indian reservation in southwestern Oregon
 Table Rock Lake, an artificial lake in Missouri and Arkansas
 Table Rock State Park (South Carolina)
 Table Rock Wilderness in northwestern Oregon
 Upper and Lower Table Rock, volcanic plateaus in southwestern Oregon